Queensland Rail operates ten suburban lines and three interurban lines. Centring in the Brisbane City, it extends as far as Gympie in the north, Varsity Lakes in the south, Rosewood in the west, and Cleveland in the east to Moreton Bay.

Each line is ascribed a colour and name on all Queensland Rail signage and marketing collateral including timetables, posters and maps. There are 153 stations in the Queensland Rail City network.

Rail lines

North of Brisbane

South of Brisbane

Inner Brisbane

Closed lines
Beaudesert line – Bethania to Beaudesert.
Beaudesert Shire Tramway – Beaudesert to Lamington and Rathdowney, operated by the Beaudesert Shire.
Belmont Tramway – Norman Park to Belmont, variously operated by the Belmont Shire, Queensland Railways and Brisbane City Council.
Bulimba line – Brunswick Street to Newstead.
Canungra line – Logan Village to Canungra.
Pinkenba line – Doomben to Pinkenba.
South Coast line – Beenleigh to Southport and Tweed Heads.
Wooloongabba line – Dutton Park to Stanley Street and South Brisbane wharves.

Railbus services
TransLink operates several bus routes along corridors on behalf of QR where the railway line has been closed to passenger traffic or supplements low-patronage lines at specific times of the day.

Improvements

The Brisbane and south east corner of Queensland has experienced significant population growth, with approximately one million more people living in the area over the last 20 years and a forecast population of more than 3.8 million by 2026. This growth has placed an unprecedented demand on public transport and its infrastructure; Citytrain has reported successive patronage increases of 9% in both the 2005–2006 and 2006–2007 financial years, and a 6.6% increase in the 2007–2008 financial year.

To respond to this demand, the Government of Queensland created the South East Queensland Infrastructure Plan and Program to manage the investment in new transport infrastructure, amongst other areas. QR, in response, created the SEQIPRAIL office to manage and deliver rail components of the plan.

Increased capacity

Beenleigh line
Previously two tracks, the added capacity allows Gold Coast line services to operate with less chance of delays. Seven railway stations along the section were significantly upgraded. The project was commissioned on 2 March 2008.

Ferny Grove line
A second track was laid between Mitchelton and Keperra railway station, including an upgrade to the intermediate stations, Oxford Park and Grovely. Upgraded with two platforms, this upgrade allows additional services to operate on the line during peak hour, and will also remove waiting times outbound from Mitchelton and inbound from Keperra. Other improvements include lifts and footbridges, to meet the Disability Standards for Accessible Public Transport, and new, modern station buildings. The further duplication of the railway between Keperra and Ferny Grove stations, plus an additional platform and parking at Ferny Grove has been completed.

Gold Coast line
The line between Ormeau and Coomera stations,  in length, was duplicated in October 2006, allowing for additional capacity. Similarly, the  length between Helensvale and Robina stations was duplicated in July 2008, removing the need for a four-minute layover at Helensvale for Robina services to wait for the Brisbane service due to the single track either side of the station.

Ipswich line
 of track between Corinda and Darra stations was quadruplicated. Previously four tracks to Corinda then two to Ipswich, the quadruplication allowed for greater capacity, especially with the Springfield railway line branching from Darra station.

Sunshine Coast line
 of track north of Caboolture station to Beerburrum station has been duplicated and re-aligned, along with the construction of stations at Elimbah and Beerburrum. Construction work began in 2007, and the project was commissioned on 14 April 2009.

From Beerburrum station,  of track to Landsborough is proposed to be similarly duplicated and re-aligned. This project is in planning stage, with construction scheduled to begin in 2020.

New lines

Gold Coast line
A  extension of the Gold Coast railway line from Robina to Varsity Lakes is completed. This is the first stage of the proposed progressive extension of the line to the Gold Coast Airport. Further extension of the line including proposed stations at Tallebudgera, Elanora and Tugun is expected to be constructed after the completion of the Cross River Rail project.

Maroochydore line
The Maroochydore railway line (or CAMCOS, Caloundra and Maroochydore Corridor Options Study), is a proposed single track line that was initially due for construction and progressive completion in stages between 2015 and 2020. However, with the launch of the Connecting SEQ 2031, a regional plan for the future of transportation in South East Queensland, the project was postponed to start in 2031, or even after. It will branch from the existing Sunshine Coast line after Beerwah railway station to Caloundra and Maroochydore in Sunshine Coast.

Springfield line
The Springfield railway line is a line extending from Darra railway station on the Ipswich line to the Springfield area. The  extension of the network had a total cost of $475 million and was completed in December 2013.

Redcliffe Peninsula line
The line is part of the QR Citytrain network, branching from the existing Caboolture line immediately after Petrie railway station, and extend to the Redcliffe peninsula. It was more seriously identified and anticipated in the 1970s, and the land was purchased in the 1980s although the line was not built. Construction commenced in 2013 and the line was opened to passengers on 4 October 2016.

CBD underground access
On 26 August 2007 the then-Minister for Transport and Main Roads, Paul Lucas, announced the Inner City Rail Capacity Study to look at underground rail access under the Brisbane central business district. Dismissing a City Loop-style scenario similar to Melbourne, citing the relatively small size of the CBD and "technical and operational constraints", Lucas imagined an underground line from Park Road station to Woolloongabba, then across the Brisbane River to connect with the Exhibition railway line, with major new stations at Woolloongabba, Gardens Point/QUT, and in the CBD. The study will also investigate the feasibility of the Exhibition line operating all year with new stations, and the upgrading of existing lines with additional tracks. Lucas allocated A$5 million to the study and appointed AECOM and Parsons Brinckerhoff as consultants to "look at options for boosting rail capacity in the city centre, including potential for an underground tunnel".
This project, Cross River Rail, is now under construction and due to open in 2024.

References

External links
Queensland Rail
TransLink

Queensland Rail City network
South East Queensland